Richard Beard (fl. 1540) was a sixteenth-century English courtier.

Beard was a member of the Privy Chamber of Henry VIII of England. He was one of the envoys, along with Nicholas Wotton, who was involved in negotiating a marriage between his monarch and his fourth wife, Anne of Cleves.

References

Year of birth missing
Year of death missing
16th-century English diplomats
English courtiers
Court of Henry VIII